The Journal of Applied Research in Memory and Cognition (abbreviated JARMAC) is a quarterly peer-reviewed scientific journal covering the study of memory and cognition. It was established in 2012 and is published by the American Psychological Association (formerly published by Elsevier) on behalf of the Society for Applied Research in Memory and Cognition, of which it is the official journal. The founding editor-in-chief was Ronald Fisher (Florida International University), followed by Paula Hertel (Trinity University). The current editor-in-chief is Qi Wang (Cornell University). According to the Journal Citation Reports, the journal has a 2021 impact factor of 4.60.

References

External links

Cognitive science journals
Quarterly journals
Elsevier academic journals
English-language journals
Academic journals associated with international learned and professional societies
Publications established in 2012